Saraycık (literally "little palace") is a Turkic word that may refer to:

Places

Turkey
 Saraycık, Ağın
 Saraycık, Amasya, a village in the district of Amasya, Amasya Province
 Saraycık, Bayburt, a village in the district of Bayburt, Bayburt Province
 Saraycık, Bayramiç
 Saraycık, Bolu, a village in the district of Bolu, Bolu Province
 Saraycık, Bozüyük, a village in the district of Bozüyük, Bilecik Province
 Saraycık, Çanakkale
 Saraycık, Çerkeş
 Saraycık, Çayırlı
 Saraycık, Gerger, a village in the district of Gerger, Adıyaman Province
 Saraycık, Gümüşhacıköy, a village in the district of Gümüşhacıköy, Amasya Province
 Saraycık, Ilgaz
 Saraycık, İskilip
 Saraycık, Kargı
 Saraycık, Kastamonu, a village in the district of Kastamonu, Kastamonu Province
 Saraycık, Kızılcahamam, a village in the district of Kızılcahamam, Ankara Province
 Saraycık, Kızılırmak
 Saraycık, Merzifon, a village in the district of Merzifon, Amasya Province
 Saraycık, Sinanpaşa, a village in the district of Sinanpaşa, Afyonkarahisar Province
 Saraycık, Sungurlu
 Saraycık, Vezirköprü, a village in the district of Vezirköprü, Samsun Province
 Saraycık, Çubuk, a village in the district of Çubuk, Ankara Province

Other
 Saray-Jük, a medieval city on the border between Europe and Asia in the 10th to 16th centuries